Briley Township is a civil township and county seat of central Montmorency County, Michigan, United States.  As of the 2000 census, the township population was 2,029 and went down to 1,860 in 2010 census.

The community of Atlanta is located primarily within the township. M-32 and M-33 meet in Atlanta along the eastern edge of the township. M-32 crosses east–west while M-33 extends north–south.

History 

Founded by the Briley Family, many of whom are buried in the Briley Cemetery in Atlanta.

Communities
Big Rock was a village here that had a post office from March until October 1882.

Geography
The Thunder Bay River drains the southern portion of the township, while tributaries of the Black River drain the northern portion.

Demographics
As of the census of 2000, there were 2,029 people, 889 households, and 590 families residing in the township. There were 1,530 housing units at an average density of 22.4 per square mile (8.6/km2). The racial makeup of the township was 97.83% White, 0.44% African American, 0.44% Native American, 0.25% Asian, and 1.03% from two or more races. Hispanic or Latino of any race were 0.69% of the population.

There were 889 households, out of which 23.8% had children under the age of 18 living with them, 53.3% were married couples living together, 9.8% had a female householder with no husband present, and 33.6% were non-families. 29.5% of all households were made up of individuals, and 13.8% had someone living alone who was 65 years of age or older.  The average household size was 2.26 and the average family size was 2.74.

In the township the population was spread out, with 20.5% under the age of 18, 6.8% from 18 to 24, 22.7% from 25 to 44, 29.5% from 45 to 64, and 20.6% who were 65 years of age or older.  The median age was 45 years. For every 100 females, there were 91.2 males.  For every 100 females age 18 and over, there were 93.3 males.

The median income for a household in the township was $27,264, and the median income for a family was $34,620. Males had a median income of $30,509 versus $19,875 for females. The per capita income for the township was $15,906.  About 14.4% of families and 18.5% of the population were below the poverty line, including 31.8% of those under age 18 and 10.7% of those age 65 or over.

References 

Townships in Montmorency County, Michigan
Townships in Michigan